The Yakovlev Ya-19, (aka S-19 or AIR-19), was a 5-seat light transport aircraft developed directly from the 
Yakovlev UT-3 during the late 1930s. The Ya-19 did not enter production, despite positive results from flight trials, due to the lack of development of the UT-3 and cancellation of the Voronezh MV-6 engine program, which were the result of changing priorities in the face of the Great Patriotic War.

Design and development
A derivative of the Yakovlev UT-3, the Ya-19was developed as a five-seat light transport by lead designer Oleg K. Antonov.

The Ya-19 mated the wings undercarriage, tail unit and engines of the UT-3 with a new fuselage seating five with a single pilot. Access to the cabin and cockpit was by a door on the port side adjacent to the trailing edge. Four passengers sat in the cabin, two a side and the fifth sat next to the right of the pilot in the cockpit.

In 1940 Aeroflot requested that the Ya-19 should be produced for use on short haul routes, but the increasing pace of rearmament in the Soviet Union meant that only a single prototype was built. Production was curtailed when the UT-3 failed to achieve large scale production.

An ambulance version capable of carrying two stretchers, one walking wounded and a medical assistant was proposed to the VVS. A mock-up review commission approved the design but production relied on continued development of the UT-3 and Ya-19, which was curtailed due to war requirements.

Use of the AIR-19 designation would have been very brief, if used at all, as AIR was dropped as a designation when A.I. Rykov was purged in one of Stalin's pogroms.

Operational history
The sole prototype completed manufacturer's testing in October 1939 and was then passed to the NII GVF (Nauchno-Issledovatel'skiy Institut Grazdahnskovo Vozdooshnovo Flota - civil air fleet scientific test institute), for state acceptance trials which it passed with good results. Fate of the prototype is unknown.

Specifications (Ya-19)

References

1930s Soviet civil aircraft
Ya-19
Aircraft first flown in 1939
Twin piston-engined tractor aircraft